Always Sometimes Monsters is a role-playing video game created by Canadian indie developers Justin Amirkhani and Jake Reardon, developed by Vagabond Dog and published by Devolver Digital. The game was released on 21 May 2014 for Microsoft Windows. A later update using the MonoGame framework brought the game to OS X and Linux on 8 January 2015 and to iOS and Android on 28 May 2015.

The game puts players in the role of an author who receives notice that the love of their life is marrying someone else across the country within a month. After being evicted from their apartment on the east coast, players then head to the west coast in order to intercept the wedding and win back the love they lost.

Gameplay 
As the game starts, players are introduced to their character through a narrative sequence that allows the selection of their character and love interest. The player's relationship with their love interest can be both straight or gay, depending on their choice. From there, the game begins its narrative, told through text windows supported by character portraits. Players make choices in dialogue and in action to alter the course of the story and change the fate of their protagonist.

Players can walk around to explore city environments, interact with NPCs, and find the means to earn money so they may progress to the next location. This often means taking repetitive odd jobs for low pay, or compromising a concept of morality.

The game plays out over a span of 30 in-game days, with time progressing through morning, day, and night as activities and events are completed. Choosing how to spend time during the journey is a key component of the game, as some options disable others.

Reception 

The PlayStation 4 version received "favourable" reviews, while the PC and iOS versions received "mixed or average reviews" according to the review aggregation website Metacritic.

Sequel 
A sequel, Sometimes Always Monsters, was announced on 13 August 2015. Although announced for 2016, it was eventually released on April 2, 2020.

References

External links 
 
 

2014 video games
Android (operating system) games
Devolver Digital games
IOS games
LGBT-related video games
Linux games
MacOS games
Nintendo Switch games
PlayStation 4 games
RPG Maker games
Role-playing video games
Single-player video games
Video games developed in Canada
Video games featuring protagonists of selectable gender
Video games with alternate endings
Windows games